One Penny may refer to:

Currency 
The penny is or has been a unit of currency in some countries. Coins inscribed "One Penny" have included:

In use 
Penny (British decimal coin), worth one hundredth of a British pound
Penny (United States coin), worth one hundredth of a US dollar
Penny (Canadian coin), worth one hundredth of a Canadian dollar

Distribution ceased 
Penny (British pre-decimal coin), worth one two-hundred-and-fortieth of a British pound (demonetised 1971)
Penny (Australian coin), worth one hundredth of an Australian pound (demonetised 1966)

In film 
One Penny (2017 film)

See also
Penny (disambiguation)